Ismaël Kenneth Jordan Koné (born June 16, 2002) is a professional soccer player who plays as a midfielder for Watford. Born in Ivory Coast, he represents the Canada national team.

Early life
Koné was born in Abidjan, Ivory Coast. In 2010, he moved to Canada at age 7, growing up in Montreal. Two years later, he began playing youth soccer with the AS Notre-Dame-de-Grâce Panthers. When he was 16, he joined CS Saint-Laurent. With CS Saint-Laurent he earned the bronze medal at the 2019 Canadian Under-17 Championship. He went on trial in Belgium with Genk and Mouscron, but was unable to sign with Mouscron as they didn't have the funds available to sign a non-European player. Soon afterwards, he was forced to return to Canada due to the COVID-19 pandemic, where he began training with CF Montreal U23 and earned an invite to the first team's training camp in 2021.

Club career

CF Montréal
After spending a few months training with the CF Montréal first team, initially unable to sign a contract due to “some technicalities in MLS rules,” Koné officially signed a two-year contract with two option years on August 13, 2021. However, soon after signing his contract he suffered a knee injury, which limited his participation in training. After the 2021 season, he went to train with Montreal's sister club, Italian Serie A club Bologna. Koné made his professional debut and scored his first goal with Montreal in a 3–0 win against Santos Laguna on February 23, 2022, in the 2022 CONCACAF Champions League. During the 2022 summer transfer window, English Championship clubs Sheffield United and Norwich City were reported to have approached Montréal over Koné's services.

Watford
In December 2022, English Championship club Watford announced they had agreed to sign Koné on a transfer from CF Montréal, with the midfielder signing a four-and-a-half year deal. He made his debut on January 7, 2023, starting an FA Cup match against Reading.

International career
Koné was eligible to play for Canada and the Ivory Coast. In March 2022, Koné was called up to Canada for their final window of 2022 FIFA World Cup qualification matches. He made his debut on March 24 against Costa Rica, as a substitute for Jonathan Osorio. Koné scored his first international goal for Canada in a friendly against Bahrain on November 11, 2022. Two days later on November 13, he was named to Canada's 26-man squad for the 2022 FIFA World Cup. He appeared in all three of the team's matches at the World Cup. At the end of the year, Koné was named the men's 2022 Canada Soccer Young Player of the Year.

Career statistics

Club

International

Honours
Individual
Canada Soccer Youth Player of the Year: 2022

References

External links
 CF Montreal Profile
 

2002 births
Living people
Footballers from Abidjan
Canadian soccer players
Canada men's international soccer players
Ivorian footballers
Ivorian emigrants to Canada
Association football midfielders
CF Montréal players
Major League Soccer players
2022 FIFA World Cup players
Watford F.C. players
English Football League players
Canadian expatriate soccer players
Expatriate footballers in England
Canadian expatriate sportspeople in England